Balloon modelling or balloon twisting is the shaping of special modelling balloons into almost any given shape, often a balloon animal. People who create balloon animals and other twisted balloon decoration sculptures are called Twisters, Balloon Benders, and Balloon Artists. Twisters often perform in restaurants, at birthday parties, fairs and at public and private events or functions.

Two of the primary design styles are "single balloon modelling", which restricts itself to the use of one balloon per model, and "multiple balloon modelling", which uses more than one balloon. Each style has its own set of challenges and skills, but few twisters who have reached an intermediate or advanced skill level limit themselves to one style or another. Depending on the needs of the moment, they might easily move between the one-balloon or multiple approaches, or they might even incorporate additional techniques such as "weaving" and "stuffing". Modelling techniques have evolved to include a range of very complex moves, and a highly specialized vocabulary has emerged to describe the techniques involved and their resulting creations.
Some twisters inflate their balloons with their own lungs, and for many years this was a standard and necessary part of the act. However, many now use a pump of some sort, whether it is a hand pump, an electric pump plugged in or run by a battery pack, or a compressed gas tank containing air or nitrogen. Twisters do not generally fill their creations with helium, as these designs will not usually float anyway. The balloons for twisting are too porous for helium and the designs are generally too heavy for their size for helium to lift.

Origins

The origins of balloon modelling are unknown. The 1975 book by "Jolly the Clown" Art Petri credits "Herman Bonnert from Pennsylvania at a magician's convention in 1939" as being the first balloontwister. Val Andrews, in Manual of Balloon Modeling, Vol. 1, An Encyclopedic Series, credits H.J. Bonnert of Scranton, Pennsylvania as being the "daddy of them all". Jim Church III states, "Frank Zacone from Youngstown, Ohio was doing a balloon act during the 1940s and had been doing the act for some time."  Another candidate for first balloon twister is Henry Maar.

Equipment

Two essential items are required for balloon twisting:
 An assortment of balloons, usually in various colors. Balloon sizes are usually identified by a number: the most common size of twisting balloons is called a "260", as it is approximately two inches in diameter and 60 inches long. Thus, a "260" is 2×60 inches and a "160" is 1×60 inches when fully blown up. Although these are the most common sizes used, there are dozens of other shapes available as well.
 An inflation device. The most common methods are air pumps similar to bicycle pumps, electric air compressors, and via the mouth. Inflating a balloon via the mouth is difficult and can be dangerous. Particularly well-trained and talented twisters, however, can blow-up several balloons at once, and some can even blow up 160s, which are much more difficult to mouth-inflate than the more common 260s, as their narrowness requires a great deal more strength and breath pressure to inflate.

Common models

Single balloon
Basic four-legged animal: Three locking twists. The first forms nose, ears/face, and neck; the second, front legs and body; the third, back legs and tail. Different proportions can be used to represent a dachshund, a giraffe, etc.
Elephant: A hook twist trunk followed by a bean twist face and two large "elephant ear" twists, finished with two locking twists as above.
Helmet: Three bubble roll through sized to fit a person's head.
Sword: Twofold twists form the cross piece, with one short and one long bubble forming the handle and blade.

Multiple balloon

Big dog
Butterfly
Characters
Dinosaur
Flowers
Teddy bear
Lion
Turtle
Monkey on palm tree
Fish on a fishing pole
Motorbike
Octopus
Owl
Penguin
Rabbit

See also
 Ralph Dewey

Notes

External links
 'Pop Art', Jonathan Allen, Cabinet, issue 37, 2010

Visual arts media
Modelling
Party equipment